Thunder Bay is a city on Lake Superior in the province of Ontario, Canada.

Thunder Bay also refers to several other things in North America's Great Lakes region.

Places

In Canada
Thunder Bay is the name of several places in the province of Ontario:
 Thunder Bay District, Ontario, a district in Northwestern Ontario
 Unorganized Thunder Bay District
 Thunder Bay (Ontario landform), a bay of Lake Superior in Ontario for which the district and city are named
 Thunder Bay International Airport or Thunder Bay Water Aerodrome, aerodromes in the city of Thunder Bay
 Thunder Bay, in the Niagara Region, a neighbourhood of Fort Erie, Ontario
 Thunder Bay Port Authority, oversees the operation of Thunder Bay's port on behalf of Transport Canada

Electoral districts in Ontario
Current
 Thunder Bay—Atikokan (provincial electoral district)
 Thunder Bay—Rainy River
 Thunder Bay—Superior North
 Thunder Bay—Superior North (provincial electoral district)
Defunct
 Thunder Bay—Atikokan
 Thunder Bay (electoral district)
 Thunder Bay and Rainy River

In the United States
Thunder Bay is the name of several places in the US state of Michigan
 Thunder Bay (Michigan), a bay of Lake Huron on which the city of Alpena is located
 Thunder Bay National Marine Sanctuary, marine sanctuary and underwater preserve which encompasses Thunder Bay and follows Alpena County's borders
 Thunder Bay Island, an island within the sanctuary, near Thunder Bay
 Thunder Bay River, a river which empties into Thunder Bay
 A fictional city in the film Anatomy of a Murder

Sport
 Thunder Bay Border Cats, a baseball team in Thunder Bay, Ontario, which is part of the collegiate summer Northwoods League
 Thunder Bay Chill, an association football team founded in 2000 in Thunder Bay, Ontario, which is part of the Premier Development League
 Thunder Bay North Stars, a Junior "A" ice hockey team founded in 2000 in Thunder Bay, Ontario, which is part of the Superior International Junior League
 Thunder Bay Northern Hawks, a Junior "B" ice hockey team founded in 1999 in Thunder Bay, Ontario, which is part of the  Thunder Bay Junior B Hockey League
 Thunder Bay Fighting Walleye, a Junior "B" ice hockey team founded in 2009 in Thunder Bay, Ontario, which is part of the  Thunder Bay Junior B Hockey League

Defunct 
 Thunder Bay Bearcats, a Junior "A" ice hockey team in Thunder Bay, Ontario, part of the Superior International Junior League (2006–2009)
 Thunder Bay Beavers, a Junior "A" ice hockey team in Thunder Bay, Ontario, part of the Junior A League 1971–1978; previously known as the Vulcans and the Centennials
 Thunder Bay Bombers, a senior ice hockey team in Thunder Bay, Ontario; it had been previously known as the Twins
 Thunder Bay Bulldogs, a Junior "A" ice hockey team in Thunder Bay, Ontario, part of the Superior International Junior League (2001–2008)
 Thunder Bay Flyers, a Junior "A" ice hockey team in Thunder Bay, Ontario, part of the Junior A League (1980–2000); previously known as the Kings
 Thunder Bay Hornets, a Junior "A" ice hockey team in Thunder Bay, Ontario, part of the Junior A League (1982–1986)
 Thunder Bay Thunder Cats, an ice hockey team in Thunder Bay, Ontario, 1991–1999 before moving to Rockford; previously known as the Thunder Hawks and Senators
 Thunder Bay Twins, an ice hockey team in Thunder Bay, Ontario, 1970–1991, member of several leagues during its existence
 Thunder Bay Whiskey Jacks, a baseball team in Thunder Bay, Ontario, 1993–1998, one of the founding members of the independent Northern League
 Thunder Bay Wolverines, an ice hockey team in Thunder Bay, Ontario, 2003–2010

Other uses
 Thunder Bay (film), a 1953 film directed by Anthony Mann
 Thunder Bay, a 2018 investigative podcast series directed and hosted by Ryan McMahon, produced by Jesse Brown, and released by Canadaland
 Thunder Bay Press, a book publisher
 Thunder Bay (podcast), by Ryan McMahon on the Canadaland network
 Thunder Bay (ship), a bulk carrier operated on the North American Great Lakes by the Canada Steamship Lines

See also
 Thunderbird Bay, Texas